Awake is an English language hit in Norway for the Norwegian band Donkeyboy, their fourth single taken from their album Caught in a Life after singles "Ambitions" and "Sometimes" (both #1s for 13 and 8 weeks consecutively in the Norwegian Singles Chart) and "Broke My Eyes" (that reached #6).

"Awake" released in 2009 reached #8 in the Norwegian Singles Chart.

Charts

References 

2009 singles
Donkeyboy songs
2009 songs
Warner Music Group singles
Songs written by Simen Eriksrud
Songs written by Cato Sundberg